The Ireland men's national under 20 ice hockey team is the national under-20 ice hockey team of Ireland. The team is controlled by the Irish Ice Hockey Association, a member of the International Ice Hockey Federation.

History
Ireland played its first game in 2001 during a qualification game against Luxembourg for participation in Division III of the 2002 World Junior Ice Hockey Championships. The game was held in Luxembourg City, Luxembourg, with Ireland losing 10–0. The game was part of a three team qualification tournament which included Iceland, Ireland and Luxembourg. The tournament was won by Iceland who won both of their games, including the 20–1 win over Ireland which was recorded as Ireland's worst ever loss, and gained promotion to the 2002 World Junior Ice Hockey Championships. Ireland who lost both of their games failed to qualify.

International competitions
2001 World Junior Ice Hockey Championships Division III Qualification. Finish: 3rd

See also
Ireland men's national ice hockey team

References

External links
Irish Ice Hockey Association

junior
Junior national ice hockey teams